North Carolina Highway 33 (NC 33) is a primary state highway in the U.S. state of North Carolina. It bypasses a large portion of the cities of Rocky Mount and Greenville, and goes through central Tarboro.

Route description

Rocky Mount area
NC 33 starts at NC 4/NC 48 near Red Oak, located east of Whitakers, when NC 33 reaches Whitakers, it turns north with US 301 and then turns east crossing the railroad tracks and then enters Edgecombe County.

Tarboro area
When NC 33 leaves Whitakers, it meets a junction with NC 97 in a small town called Leggett on its way to Tarboro, when NC 33 reaches Tarboro it turns left running east, as NC 33 crosses the Tar River, it enters Princeville, than meets a junction with US 258 and NC 111, and follows it going east, when NC 33 leaves Princeville, it runs south, and meets a junction with US 64 (exit 487).

Greenville area
In Pitt County, NC 33 meets a junction with the eastern terminus of NC 222 in Belvoir on its way to Greenville, as it crosses US 264 (exit 77), when it reaches Greenville it turns into Belvoir Highway, until it reaches US 13/NC 11/NC 903, when it reaches US 13/NC 11/NC 903, it runs south with them being Memorial Drive, and then loops south to Greene Street leaving US 13/NC 11/NC 903. When NC 33 reaches US 264 again, it meets a junction of US 264 Alternate's eastern terminus, and loops south with it as Greenville Boulevard, when NC 33 runs east leaving Greenville, it passes through a road junction with Blackjack-Simpson Road bypassing Simpson on its way to Grimesland, after leaving Grimesland, it meets a road junction with Grimes Farm Road on its way to Beaufort County, when NC 33 bypasses Grimes Farm Road again, it enters Beaufort County, and than meets a road junction with Godley Road.

Pamlico area
In Beaufort County when NC 33 reaches Chocowinity, it meets a junction crossing US 17 Business, when NC 33 leaves Chocowinity, it meets a junction crossing US 17 (exit 176), the route then downgrade to a rural road on its way to Aurora, right before when NC 33 reaches Aurora, it meets a junction with NC 306, and runs east together until they reach Aurora, when they both reach Aurora NC 306 turns left going north, and NC 33 goes straight running east, after NC 33 leaves Aurora it enters Pamlico County, and loops south, when NC 33 reaches NC 304 it runs south with it til it reaches Hobucken, when they both reach Hobucken, they end together at Hobucken School Road.

History

NC 33 was first created in 1929 or 1930 as a spur of parent route NC 30 that ran from Chocowinity to Aurora. It was extended between 1936 and 1938 through Washington as an alternative routing to NC 11. Around 1948-1953, the route's eastern terminus was moved to its current location at Hobucken. Throughout the 1970s, NC 33 was moved in the Washington area and extended through Greenville, taking the place of the old US 264 and NC 30 alignments in the area. In 1994, the final extension occurred during the Tarboro renumbering; the new alignment passed through Tarboro and then picked up the former NC 44's routing through Whitakers to end at NC 4/NC 48.

Major intersections

See also
 North Carolina Bicycle Route 2 - concurrent with NC 33 from Old Sparta (NC 42) to Belvoir Crossroads
 North Carolina Bicycle Route 3 - concurrent with NC 33 along the NC 306 concurrency

References

External links

NCRoads.com: N.C. 33

Transportation in Nash County, North Carolina
Transportation in Edgecombe County, North Carolina
Transportation in Pitt County, North Carolina
Transportation in Beaufort County, North Carolina
Transportation in Pamlico County, North Carolina
033